Four Eyes! is an animated television series created by Darryl Kluskowski and co-produced by PorchLight Entertainment, Pictor Media and Telegael Teoranta for France 3.

Plot summary
The series centers around a misanthropic alien girl called Emma, who is sent to earth by her parents to repeat the fifth grade.

Characters
Emma (voiced by Jules de Jongh) is an 11-year-old girl from the planet Albacore 7. She was sent to the Payne Academy boarding school by her parents, after flunking the fifth grade back home. Usually, squid-like in appearance, Emma uses a device shaped like a pair of glasses to alter her appearance into a human form. She has a plethora of alien abilities, including multiple psychic powers, the ability to fire a matter-disintegration beam from her fingers, being able to hold her breath for a long time, and many others. In human form, Emma has the physical appearance of a stereotypical geek; she has buck teeth and wears glasses. She has a severe allergy to dairy products.
Skyler (voiced by Eric Myers) and Pete (voiced by Lizzie Waterworth) are Emma's best friends. They are the only ones who know her secret. While they are both quintessential "nerds", Pete has a tendency to be very panicky and over-dramatic, while Skyler tends to be calmer and more collected. Like Emma, they both wear glasses and have at least one snaggletooth. Pete has a crush on another girl called Isabelle.
Alexis and Roland Billingsford (voiced by Lizzie Waterworth and Regina Candler) are the school snobs. They act superior to everyone else. While both of them dislike Emma, Alexis especially hates her, going out of her way to cause her trouble. Roland is later revealed to not be as bad as he seems, and was actually pushed into the bullying life by his sister.
Redgar (voiced by Eric Myers) as : Star of the Withering Vine school's soccer team. Emma has a crush on him. They have both come into contact before, and Redgar has shown to be really nice to Emma and even inviting her on a date to watch a football game. In one episode, Redgar showed interest in a girl from his own school, causing Emma to become extremely jealous which caused her to turn into a demonic monster, far from her alien appearance.
Miss Dowager (voiced by Joanna Ruiz) is the strict teacher at Payne Academy. She lavishes praise on the Billingsford twins, whilst looking for any excuse to send Emma and her friends to detention. It is later revealed that the reason she hates Emma so much is because her last boyfriend left her for a woman with the same name.
Isabelle is a girl who is a student at Payne Academy. Pete has a crush on her.
Coach Stebbins (voiced by Tom Clarke Hill) is the students' physical education teacher. A former officer in the army, he sees no difference between the students and his former platoon, treating them like grunts and calling them "privates".
Headmaster Payne (voiced by Tom Clarke Hill) is the headmaster of Payne Academy. An easy-going, good-natured man, he prefers not to punish his students unless necessary, and often tries to "connect" with his young charges. In Plasma Psychic Analysis he, thanks to Emma, gets the characteristics of a cat. In one episode, Emma actually impersonated him by speaking with a man's voice into the PA and actually doing a good job.
Emma's Parents (voiced by Regina Candler and Tom Clarke Hill) are Emma's parents. Although living on Albacore 7, they often talk with Emma through a communications device disguised as a lava lamp.

Episode list

Season 1
 Who's Who? / So Dreamy
 The Test / Bad Hair Day
 Goal Oriented / They Are Among Us
 Zoo-Illogical / Miss Dowager's Secret
 Science Friction / Parents From Space
 The Fifth Emma / Cold Hearted
 Lost Connection / Pete and Re-Pete
 Headmaster Emma / Making Plans for Pete
 Miss Academy Mishap / Falling Star
 Miss Pop Hilarity / Plasmic Psycho Alien-Alysis
 Cheaters Never Win / No Payne, No Gain!
 Frog Day Afternoon / The Last Judgment
 Gone to the Dogs / Roomies

Season 2
 The Pool / Who Needs You?
 Alter Ego / Less Humanity Please!
 Til' Debt Do Us Part / The Unknown Comic
 
 Homesick is Where the Heart Is / Mad About You
 Desperately Seeking Skyler / Love is For Dummies
 Venus de Pete / The Loch Ness Emma
 Back to Nature / Spoiled Milk
 Big Bang Boom / Two Faced Emma
 The Milk Man / Radio Free Earth
 Fish Feud / Ben and Julie
 Monkey See, Monkey Do / Mother's Day

References

External links
 Four Eyes on tv.com

Four Eyes! at the Big Cartoon Database

2000s American animated television series
2000s French animated television series
2006 American television series debuts
2006 French television series debuts
American children's animated comedy television series
French children's animated comedy television series
Animated television series about children